Arsinde of Carcassonne (920 – 970) was a Countess and ruler of Carcassonne, France.

Biography

Arsinde de Carcassonne was born c. 920 to d'Acfred de Carcassonne. Her father was head of the ruling house of Carcasonne and had no surviving sons. When he died in 934 the title and land was given to his daughter.

She married Arnaud de Comminges, a local noble with whom she had at least four children. Arsinde ruled for twenty three years before she died, leaving her titles to her son Roger.

Issue
 Adélaïde de Comminges
 Roger I of Carcassonne
 Odon I of Razes
 Arsinde de Carcassonne

Sources

920 births
970 deaths
Nobility
10th-century French women
People from Carcassonne
Counts of Carcassonne
10th-century women rulers